Arivechi is a town in Arivechi Municipality in the Mexican state of Sonora.

The settlement of San Javier de Arivechi was founded in 1627 by the Jesuit missionary Pedro Méndez.  The land had been occupied by the Opata tribe, conceded in the mission system of the Rectorado de San Francisco de Borja together with the peoples of Pónida y Bacanora.  Arivechi became a municipality in 1932.

The area is crossed by the Sahuaripa River, which is a tributary of the Yaqui River.

The economy is based on cattle raising and agriculture.

Arivechi lies on tarmacked highway 117, which links Arivechi to Agua Prieta.

Sources consulted 

 Enciclopedia de los Municipios de Mexico
 Inegi

External links 

 Arivechi, Ayuntamiento Digital (Official WebSite of Arivechi, Sonora)
 Photos of Arivechi
 Arivechi in the Pueblos de Sonora site 
 Imagenes de Sonora 

Populated places in Sonora
Populated places established in 1627